Hammerschmidtia is a Holarctic genus of hoverflies whose larvae live in sap under the bark of freshly fallen trees.

Diagnostics
For terminology see Speight key to genera and glossary
The face of the male is tuberculate, with long hairs on the upper and lower sides of the lower three-quarters of the arista. Most of the hairs are several times longer than the arista. The scutum is armed with very evident spines, while the anepisternum, postalar callus, and scutellum have strong bristles. The abdomen is twice as long as the thorax, and the first posterior cell does not end acutely from the apex of the wing. The apical section of R4+5 is longer than the crossvein r-m, and the upper marginal cross-vein M1 is curved inwards where it meets R4+5. The legs are armed with spines and the anterior four tibiae terminate in a row of bristles. The femora are considerably swollen, especially the hind pair, which has numerous conspicuous spines below.   
Genitalia described by Sedman

Species
Hammerschmidtia ferruginea (Fallén, 1817) 
Hammerschmidtia ingrica (Stackelberg, 1952)
Hammerschmidtia rufa
Hammerschmidtia sedmani (Vockeroth, Moran & Skevington, 2019) 
Hammerschmidtia tropia (Chu, 1994)

References

External links
 Images representing Hammerschmidtia

Diptera of Europe
Eristalinae
Hoverfly genera